K-279 was the first Project 667B Murena (also known by the NATO reporting name Delta I) ballistic missile submarine of the Soviet Navy. Development of Project 667B began in 1965.  Her keel was laid down in 1971 by Sevmash at the Severodvinsk shipyard.  She was launched in January 1972, and commissioned in the Soviet Northern Fleet on 22 December 1972.

Service history
The submarine rolled about 20 degrees and lost depth control, diving to  before recovering. The submarine continued her mission for another two months before returning to port, despite the significant damage she had suffered.

The American writers claims that on 20 October 1986,  collided with K-279 in the eastern Atlantic.

In 1992, K-279 was decommissioned and held in reserve.  In 1998 she was dismantled at Zvezdochka shipyard in Severodvinsk and her reactor section was towed to Sayda Bay.

See also
 , another Soviet submarine which allegedly hit .

References

External links 
This article includes material adapted from the Bellona Foundation's Web site and from an 8 June 2004 interview with Rear-Admiral Vitaly Fedorin by Pravda.

Delta-class submarines
Ships built in the Soviet Union
1972 ships
Cold War submarines of the Soviet Union
Maritime incidents in 1986
Ships built by Sevmash